The black dorcopsis or black forest wallaby (Dorcopsis atrata) is a species of marsupial in the family Macropodidae. It is endemic to an island at the eastern end of New Guinea where its natural habitat is subtropical or tropical dry forests. It is threatened by habitat loss and hunting, its population is declining and the IUCN lists it as being "Critically endangered".

Description
The black dorcopsis has black upper parts and dark brown underparts. It has a long muzzle, a naked snout, small rounded ears and a tail which lacks hair on its hind half. Its fore limbs are robust but its hind limbs and feet are relatively small.

Biology
The black dorcopsis is believed to be mainly nocturnal but may move around during the day in dense forest. It feeds on shoots, leaves, grasses, fruit and roots which it gathers with its mouth and manipulates with its fore paws. A young black dorcopsis develops in its mother's pouch. There are four nipples in the pouch despite the fact that there is normally only a single juvenile developing there at any one time.

Status
It spends most of the year in oak forests at altitudes of between  where there is little undergrowth but the ground is carpeted with mosses, lichens and ferns. It descends seasonally to gullies and lower ground at which time it is vulnerable to being hunted. The montane forest is being degraded using slash and burn techniques and is eventually being converted into grassland. Although the black dorcopsis is common in suitable habitat, the overall population is declining and the IUCN lists its conservation status as being "Critically endangered".

References

Macropods
Mammals of Papua New Guinea
Mammals described in 1957
Taxonomy articles created by Polbot
Marsupials of New Guinea